Joe Gaston (1926 or 1927 – 15 March 2018) was a Unionist politician in Northern Ireland.

Gaston worked as a farmer and served part-time in the Ulster Defence Regiment. In 1973, he was elected to Ballymoney Borough Council as a non-party candidate.  He was re-elected in 1977, for the Ulster Unionist Party (UUP).

In December 1977, Gaston's right leg was removed by a bomb planted in his tractor by the Provisional Irish Republican Army.

Gaston was elected at the 1982 Northern Ireland Assembly election in North Antrim. In 1985, he served as Deputy Mayor of Ballymoney, then as Mayor from 1986–87 and 1990–1993.

At the 1992 general election, Gaston contested Ian Paisley's North Antrim seat, taking second place with 18.1% of the votes cast. In 1996, he was elected to the Northern Ireland Forum, again in North Antrim, and served his final term as Mayor of Ballymoney.

Gaston lost his council seat to Sinn Féin's Daithi McKay in 2005.

References

1920s births
2018 deaths
Mayors of places in Northern Ireland
Members of Ballymoney Borough Council
Members of the Northern Ireland Forum
Northern Ireland MPAs 1982–1986
Farmers from Northern Ireland
Ulster Unionist Party councillors
Ulster Defence Regiment soldiers
British amputees